Benjamin Burras Rayburn (August 11, 1916 – March 5, 2008) was an American politician. He served as a Democratic member of the Louisiana House of Representatives. He also served as a member for the 12nd district of the Louisiana State Senate.

Born in Sumrall, Mississippi. Rayburn attended at the Sumrall High School, where he later attended at the Sullivan Memorial Trade School. He served as a member of the Washington Parish Police Jury, in which he was considered as the youngest member of Louisiana. Rayburn served from 1944 to 1948, in which he had also served as the vice president. He had served as a member of the Louisiana Cattleman's Association.

In 1948, Rayburn won the election for an office of the Louisiana House of Representatives. He succeeded Murphy R. Williams. In 1951, Rayburn was succeeded by N. L. Smith for which he was resigned to serve for the 12nd district of the Louisiana State Senate. He succeeded politician H. H. Richardson. Rayburn was honored the honorary degree by the Loyola University. In 1993, he was honored in the Louisiana Political Museum and Hall of Fame. In 1996, Rayburn was succeeded by Phil Short for the 12nd district of the Louisiana State Senate.

In the 1990s, Rayburn politician career had ended of scandal for which his colleague who was attorney Larry S. Bankston. He had stated "I'm going to wait until I see the allegations before I make a comment". His daughter Tommie Jean had tried to help out Fred Goodson, a store owner. He was considered not guilty for which he had lost his offer for his 12nd district office term of the Louisiana State Senate. In 2006, Rayburn's name was honored into the Louisiana Department of Public Safety & Corrections prison place Washington Correctional Institute, in which was renamed to the B.B. Rayburn Correctional Center.

Rayburn died in March 2008 from complications of lung cancer at the St. Tammany Hospital in Covington, Louisiana, at the age of 91.

References 

1916 births
2008 deaths
People from Sumrall, Mississippi
Democratic Party Louisiana state senators
Democratic Party members of the Louisiana House of Representatives
20th-century American politicians
Deaths from lung cancer in Louisiana